Discovery Ski Area is an alpine ski area in the state of Montana, United States. Situated on Rumsey and Jubilee mountains, the area consists of four different faces and provides for beginner groomed runs to expert bowl skiing. Discovery offers 2200 acres of skiing with over 8000 feet of elevation at the Summit. The ski area is often open early in the season and is known to stay open late into the next year often extending lift operations until the month of April. Discovery is usually only open on weekends to begin the season, but days and hours will often expand through the winter season.

Location
Discovery is located near the town of Philipsburg, Montana, off Montana Highway 1, and is situated along the Pintler Scenic Loop opposite of Georgetown Lake. Discovery Ski Area is located in the Beaverhead–Deerlodge National Forest.

External links
 Official Website

Buildings and structures in Granite County, Montana
Ski areas and resorts in Montana
Tourist attractions in Granite County, Montana